A Christmas of Love is the ninth studio album by American singer Keith Sweat. It was released by Sweat Shop Records and Rhino Records on 	November 20, 2007.

Critical reception
AllMusic found that "Sweat knows something about contemporary R&B, and his smooth loverman sound, with just a touch of light hip-hop flavor, is all over Christmas of Love [...] With the exception of "The Christmas Song," Sweat steers clear of traditional material, opting instead for narratives of romantic love placed in a holiday context such as "Be Your Santa Claus" and "Under the Tree." Sweat's singing sounds as good as it did in the '80s, and this disc should provide a soundtrack for lovers looking to generate a Yuletide spark." Herald & Review remarked that "tracks such as “Party Christmas” and “Be Your Santa Claus” create the impression that Christmas is just one more occasion for a boudoir workout."

Track listing

Charts

Release history

References

2007 Christmas albums
Keith Sweat albums
Rhino Records albums